Pothos repens is a climbing tropical forest plant in the family Araceae and the genus Pothos.  No subspecies are recorded in the Catalogue of Life.

The distribution of P. repens is: China (Guangdong, Guangxi, Hainan, Hong Kong), Laos and Vietnam. In Vietnamese it is called ráy bò or cơm ninh.

References

External links
 
 
 International Aroid Society: 8. Pothos repens (Lour.) Druce.

Pothoideae
Flora of Indo-China
Flora of Vietnam